The Dale General Hospital, located in Worcester, Massachusetts, was set up by the Federal Government to care for Union soldiers principally from Massachusetts regiments. In order to set up hospital quickly, the government leased the campus of a former female college campus on Union Hill, a mile south of the center of the city. To house the patients, fourteen pavilions were erected behind the existing building. The former college was used by the physicians, administrators, and staff.

The first patients were admitted in October, 1864 and the formal dedication took place on Washington's Birthday in the following year.  Overall, the hospital treated 1,182 patients.  Soon after the close of the Civil War, the government terminated the lease and auctioned the barracks and their contents. The Dale General Hospital had a life span of fourteen months. Later on Isaac Davis bought the building and land to make it into Worcester Academy.

References

Hospital buildings completed in 1864
American Civil War hospitals
Defunct hospitals in Massachusetts
Hospitals in Worcester, Massachusetts